HD 121056, also known as HIP 67851, is a K-type giant star 209 light-years away in the constellation of Centaurus. Its surface temperature is 4867 K. HD 121056’s concentration of heavy elements is similar to the Sun, with a metallicity Fe/H index of 0.020, although the star is enriched in lighter rock-forming elements like magnesium and aluminum.

Planetary system
In 2014, two planets orbiting HD 121056 were discovered by the radial velocity method, and were confirmed a few months later. The orbits of these planets are stable on astronomical timescales, although the periods are not in orbital resonance. In 2022, the inclination and true mass of HD 121056 c were measured via astrometry.

The planetary system configuration is favorable for direct imaging of exoplanets in the near future, being included in the top ten easiest targets in 2018.

References

Centaurus (constellation)
K-type giants
Planetary systems with two confirmed planets
J13535209-3518517
067851
CD-34 9223
121056
0532.1
5224